Storm were a London, England-based band, formed in 1989 by multi-instrumentalist James McNally and guitarist/tenor banjo player Tom McManamon.  The two had previously played together in Dingle Spike.

As well as playing their own shows, the band opened tours by U2 (on their Zooropa tour) and The Pogues.  McNally went on to join The Pogues, before founding Afro Celt Sound System.  McManamon would become a member of The Popes, backing Pogues frontman Shane MacGowan live and in studio, as well as touring and recording on their own. Bird of Prayer also featured drummer Dylan Howe, son of Yes guitarist Steve Howe, who has also worked with Ian Dury and the Blockheads

Discography
 Storm (1990?); cassette-only release
 Bird of Prayer (1991); cd single (Tracks: Feel It / Bird of Prayer / Something). Red Bay records (REDD 0061).
 Celtic Spirit (1996); Compilation CD includes Storm track "4610". Music Club (MCCD 243)

Other appearances
Ship Ahoy by Marxman, 1992 CD single, featuring Sinéad O'Connor (also released on 1993 Marxman album "33 Revolutions Per Minute").
Highland Tempest by Ken MacLenennan Featuring Storm, 1996 CD album. Moidart Music Group LTD. (MOICD 011)

Folk punk groups